Estadi Olímpic Lluís Companys (formerly known as the Estadi Olímpic de Montjuïc and Estadio de Montjuic) is a stadium in Barcelona, Catalonia, Spain. Originally built in 1927 for the 1929 International Exposition in the city (and Barcelona's bid for the 1936 Summer Olympics, which were awarded to Berlin), it was renovated in 1989 to be the main stadium for the 1992 Summer Olympics and 1992 Summer Paralympics.

With its current capacity of 55,926 seats (67,007 during the 1992 Olympics), Estadi Lluís Companys is the 6th largest stadium in Spain and the 2nd largest in Catalonia.

The stadium is located in the Anella Olímpica, in Montjuïc, a large hill to the southwest of the city which overlooks the harbor.

History

Designed by architect Pere Domènech i Roura for the 1929 Expo, the stadium was officially opened on 20 May 1929. The opening ceremonies included Spain's first official rugby international game against Italy, and a friendly football match between the Catalan national team and Bolton, which the Catalan team won by a shocking score of 4-0 with goals from Josep Samitier(2), Martí Ventolrà and Manuel Parera.

It was meant to host the People's Olympiad in 1936, a protest event against the 1936 Summer Olympics in Berlin, but the event had to be canceled due to the outbreak of the Spanish Civil War.

In the fifties, the stadium was the centerpiece of the 1955 Mediterranean Games, and in 1957 it hosted the only national football cup Final between FC Barcelona and RCD Espanyol, the two local clubs.

In the seventies the stadium was disused, and the stands deteriorated. When the Spanish Grand Prix and other races were held at the Montjuïc racing circuit, the stadium was used as a paddock for the teams. Due to safety concerns, the 1975 F1 race was nearly boycotted by drivers.

During the Barcelona's bid for the 1992 Summer Olympics , the stadium was totally renovated with the involvement of Italian architect Vittorio Gregotti. The stadium was gutted, preserving parts of the original facades, and new grandstands were built. In 1989 the venue was re-inaugurated for the World Cup in Athletics, and three years later it hosted the opening and closing ceremonies and all the athletics competitions of the Olympic Games and also the same functions during the Paralympics.

The stadium served as the home of football club RCD Espanyol from 1997 until 2009. The Estadi Olímpic made its final La Liga appearance during the 2008–2009 season, as Espanyol moved to the newly constructed RCDE Stadium.

It also served as the home of the Barcelona Dragons American football team until 2002. Because the size of the playing surface was slightly shorter than the regulation American Football length, the stadium only had 7-yard end zones, three yards shorter than regulation NFL size in 1991 and 1992. They were later lengthened to the standard 10 yards. The stadium also played host to the National Football League's American Bowl in 1993 and in 1994. The San Francisco 49ers played the Pittsburgh Steelers on 1 August 1993. The second game was played on 31 July 1994 between the Los Angeles Raiders and the Denver Broncos.

In 2001, the stadium was renamed after the former president of the Generalitat de Catalunya Lluís Companys, who was executed at the nearby Montjuïc Castle in 1940 by the Franco regime. In 2010, the stadium hosted the 20th European Athletics Championships.

In the 2023/24 season, the stadium will serve as the home ground for FC Barcelona due to Camp Nou redevelopments which are estimated to be completed by the 2025/26 season.

Events

Sports
1929: Montjuïc hosted its first ever event, Spain's first official rugby international game against Italy. Spain won 9–0.
1935: Boxing match Paolino Uzcudun vs. Max Schmeling
1955: II Mediterranean Games.
1989: IAAF World Cup.
1992: Games of the XXV Olympiad and IX Paralympic Games.
1993: Rugby League European Cup Final, XIII Catalans 22–23 Huddersfield RLFC
1997: World Bowl '97 between Barcelona Dragons and Rhein Fire.
2003: World Police and Fire Games.
2009: On Saturday 20 June the Perpignan-based rugby league team, Catalans Dragons lost 12–24 to Warrington Wolves in the first Super League match to be played in Spain, drawing a crowd of over 18,500.
2010: 20th European Athletics Championships.
2011: 2010–11 Heineken Cup quarter-final match between Perpignan and Toulon with a crowd of 55,000.
2012: 2012 World Junior Championships in Athletics.

Football 
1930: National football cup final between Athletic Bilbao and Real Madrid.
1933: National football cup final between Athletic Bilbao and Real Madrid.
1934: National football cup final between Valencia CF and Real Madrid.
1939: National football cup final between Sevilla FC and Racing de Ferrol.
1944: National football cup final between Athletic Bilbao and Valencia CF.
1945: National football cup final between Sevilla FC and Racing de Ferrol.
1946: National football cup final between Real Madrid and Valencia CF.
1957: National football cup final between FC Barcelona and RCD Espanyol.
2004: National football cup final between Real Madrid and Real Zaragoza.

Spain national team matches

Andorra national team matches

Music

References

External links 

Estadios de España 

Sports venues in Barcelona
Football venues in Barcelona
Rugby union stadiums in Spain
Olympic stadiums
RCD Espanyol
Barcelona Dragons
Venues of the 1992 Summer Olympics
Olympic athletics venues
Athletics in Barcelona
Athletics (track and field) venues in Spain
Sants-Montjuïc
American Bowl venues
Rugby league stadiums in Spain
World's fair architecture in Barcelona
1929 Barcelona International Exposition
Catalans Dragons
American football venues in Spain
1929 establishments in Spain
Sports venues completed in 1929